The Descent of the Nine is a 1984 Greek adventure film directed by Christos Siopahas. It won one of the three golden prizes of the 14th Moscow International Film Festival.

Cast
 Christos Kalavrouzos as Nikitas
 Antonis Antoniou as Kostis
 Vasilis Tsaglos as Sarantos
 Elias Yannitsos as Nasios
 Kostas Haralabidis
 Kostas Vihas
 Hrysanthos Hrysanthou
 Kostas Tzouvaras
 Stratos Pahis
 Dimitris Yiannakopoulos
 Christos Zorbas as Giannis

References

External links
 

1984 films
1980s adventure films
1980s Greek-language films
Greek adventure films